KIXX (96.1 FM) is a radio station broadcasting a hot adult contemporary format serving the Watertown, South Dakota, United States, area. The station is currently owned by Alpha Media, through licensee Digity 3E License, LLC.

References

External links
Watertown Radio

IXX
Hot adult contemporary radio stations in the United States
Radio stations established in 1979
1979 establishments in South Dakota
Alpha Media radio stations